Mr. Xcitement is the second solo studio album by Wu-Tang Clan member U-God. The album was released on September 13, 2005.

Background
He left Priority after the label shut down and signed with Free Agency Recordings. It is his first album to feature no production input from the RZA. The only Wu-Tang related appearance on the album is production on one track by 4th Disciple.

Release and reception
U-God has himself expressed in interviews that he does not consider Mr. Xcitement to be an official solo album, due to being displeased with the production and outcome. The album has only sold 5,500 units and also had sample clearance problems. The album is now out of print and extremely hard to find.

Track listing

References

U-God albums
2005 albums
Albums produced by 4th Disciple